Roger Madrigal (born March 14, 1972) is a Costa Rican slalom canoer.

Career
Madrigal competed from the mid-1990s to the mid-2000s. He finished 39th in the K-1 event at the 1996 Summer Olympics in Atlanta.

References
Sports-Reference.com profile

1972 births
Canoeists at the 1996 Summer Olympics
Costa Rican male canoeists
Living people
Olympic canoeists of Costa Rica